Alex Rašner (born February 12, 1996) is a Czech professional ice hockey player. He is currently playing for HC Olomouc of the Czech Extraliga.

Rašner made his Czech Extraliga debut playing with HC Olomouc during the 2014-15 Czech Extraliga season.

References

External links

1996 births
Living people
HC Olomouc players
Czech ice hockey defencemen
People from Jeseník
Sportspeople from the Olomouc Region